The page attribute table (PAT) is a processor supplementary capability extension to the page table format of certain x86 and x86-64 microprocessors.  Like memory type range registers (MTRRs), they allow for fine-grained control over how areas of memory are cached, and are a companion feature to the MTRRs.

Unlike MTRRs, which provide the ability to manipulate the behavior of caching for a limited number of fixed physical address ranges, Page Attribute Tables allow for such behavior to be specified on a per-page basis, greatly increasing the ability of the operating system to select the most efficient behavior for any given task.

Processors 
The PAT is available on Pentium III and newer CPUs, and on non-Intel CPUs.

See also 
 Write-combining

References

External links 
 Intel 64 and IA-32 Architectures Software Developer's Manual Volume 3A: System Programming Guide, Part 1 see chapter 11, section 12.

Virtual memory
X86 architecture